Cabbage palm is a common name for several species of palms or palm-like plants:

Cordyline fruticosa, a tropical tree native to Asia and Polynesia
Corypha utan, an East Asian fan palm (including Northern Australia)
Euterpe oleracea, a Brazilian palm tree
Livistona australis, an Australian palm
Roystonea oleracea, a Caribbean palm
Sabal palmetto, native to the south-eastern USA, Cuba and the Bahamas

See also
 Cabbage tree